Bairdford is a census-designated place within the township of West Deer in Allegheny County, Pennsylvania, United States. As of the 2020 census, it had a population of 855 with a median age of 44. There are 692 people classified as white, three as black, three as combination White and American Indian. There are eight people who identify as Latino. The town was built to house  coal miners.

Demographics

Notable people
Al Federoff, Major League Baseball player
Herman (Swaiko), primate of the Orthodox Church in America

References

Census-designated places in Allegheny County, Pennsylvania
Census-designated places in Pennsylvania